Noëlla Champagne (born December 25, 1944 in Saint-Tite, Quebec) is a politician from Quebec, Canada, and former Member of the National Assembly (MNA).

Career

Champagne worked as a teacher in French and history from 1964 to 1971 at the secondary level. Before her political career she was the political secretary for Champlain MNA Yves Beaumier from 1997 to 2003.

She ran as a Parti Québécois (PQ) candidate in the district of Champlain in the 2003 election (on April 14), which resulted in a tie vote.  A subsequent by-election was necessary to break the tie, and it gave Champagne, who became the 45th PQ MNA to the new assembly, the victory over Liberal candidate and former MNA Pierre-A. Brouillette by 642 votes.

In 2007 she was defeated by the Action Démocratique du Québec candidate Pierre-Michel Auger, as were many of her colleagues from the Mauricie area and other small-town regions of Quebec. In the 2008 election however, Champagne won her seat back from Auger, who had switched from the ADQ to the Quebec Liberal Party before the election.

She was defeated in the 2014 election.

Footnotes

External links
 

1944 births
Living people
Parti Québécois MNAs
Women MNAs in Quebec
21st-century Canadian politicians
21st-century Canadian women politicians